Kanyashree University is a women's university in Krishnanagar, Nadia district, West Bengal. The University was established in 2020, it will impart education in humanities and basic sciences.

Departments 
Department of English 
Department of Bengali 
Department of History
Department of Geography
Department of Social work
Department of Education
Department of Food's and Nutrition
Department of Law

See also

References

External links
kanyashreeuniversity.in/
University Grants Commission
National Assessment and Accreditation Council

Universities and colleges in Nadia district
Women's universities and colleges in West Bengal
Educational institutions established in 2020
Nadia district
2020 establishments in West Bengal